Spata may refer to:

Spata, a town in eastern Attica, Greece
Spata–Artemida, a municipality in eastern Attica, Greece
Spata, Achaea, a settlement in the municipal unit Larissos, western Achaea, Greece
Spata, a village in Bara Commune, Timiș County, Romania
Spata family